The Moschetto Automatico Revelli-Beretta Mod. 1915 (Commonly known as the Beretta Model 1918) was a self-loading carbine that entered service in 1918 with the Italian armed forces. Designed as a semi-automatic rifle, the weapon came with an overhead inserted magazine, an unconventional design based on the simplicity of allowing a spent round to be replaced using assistance from gravity. The gun was made from half of a Villar-Perosa aircraft submachine gun.

Design
Barrel rifling: 6 grooves with a right hand twist (6-right)
 Automatic carbine, cal. 9mm, having a barrel length of 12.5" and a magazine capacity of 25 rounds.

Variants

Mod.1918/30 
In the 1930s the semiautomatic Mod.1918/30 model was developed; It completely     revamped the action of the gun, replacing the delayed-blowback Villar   Perosa action with a new closed-bolt system with a loose firing pin that   was cocked by a guided rod protruding from the rear of the receiver, with     a ring-shaped cocking piece. This earned the gun the nickname "Il Siringone" ("The Syringe"). The magazine feed was also revamped, now   taking straight box magazines from the underside of the receiver. The folding bayonet was retained on most models.  Few examples of the Model 1918 survive, since the Mod.1918/30 was produced by converting existing Mod.1918s.

MIDA 
While the standard Revelli-Beretta carbine was a semi-automatic weapon only, several  experimental variants were developed with selective-fire capability.  Most of these were not made at Beretta, but at Manifattura Italianad'Armi (MIDA) in Brescia, and may have been designed by Alfredo Scotti. These included twin-trigger "bigrillo" models which  gave automatic fire on their rear triggers and single fire from their forward triggers. This type of trigger group became standard on later  Beretta submachine guns, including the well-known Model 38 series. Apart        from the trigger system, the MIDA variants also differed from the  standard Beretta in most of their components, with different stocks, sights, magazine release catches, ejection chutes, and bayonet mounts    that took the detachable Carcano TS bayonet rather than the folding     cavalry bayonet. One MIDA-made experimental model also incorporated a right-canted magazine feed; the reason for this is unknown. Although a small lot of twin-trigger MIDA submachine guns are known to have been        produced, they were probably never taken into service. The exact reason for the development of the MIDA submachine gun is still not entirely known but it was probably for a special military contract from some unit that desired a variant of the Revelli-Beretta carbine with automatic fire capability.

Users 
 
 
 :Beretta 1918/30 adopted in 1933 by the Federal Police, and Buenos Aires Provincial Police
  Surplus mod.1915 and mod.1918/30 were bought from Italy and issued to the Kebur Zabagna, possibly some were also shipped to Eritrea and captured by the Ethiopians
 :Purchased surplus Carbines, possibly around 1938

Non-state entities 

  La Cagoule:A number of Mod.1918/30 carbines were smuggled by OVRA in exchange for favours to the Italian government.

See also
Hafdasa C-4, an Argentine derivative of the Beretta Model 1918/30.
OVP 1918, another Italian submachine gun made from half of a Villar-Perosa that was produced at the same time as the Beretta Model 1918 by Officine di Villar Perosa.
Italian submachine guns

References

External links
 Beretta Model 1918 Sub-Machine Gun
 Ballester-Riguard submachine gun
 Beretta Model 1918/30

Beretta firearms
M1918
World War I Italian infantry weapons
World War II infantry weapons of Italy
World War I submachine guns
Submachine guns of Italy